is a train station located in Ōki, Fukuoka.

Lines 
Nishi-Nippon Railroad
Tenjin Ōmuta Line

Platforms

Adjacent stations

Surrounding area
 Ōki Town Office
 Ōki Junior High School
 Kisaki Elementary School
 Mizumakōhōkai Hospital
 JA Fukuoka Bank
 Ōki Agricultural Research Center
 Sunny (Supermarket) Ōki store

Railway stations in Fukuoka Prefecture
Railway stations in Japan opened in 1937